Requests is a HTTP library for the Python programming language. The goal of the project is to make HTTP requests simpler and more human-friendly. The current version is 2.28.0. Requests is released under the Apache License 2.0.

Requests is one of the most popular Python libraries that is not included with Python. It has been proposed that Requests be distributed with Python by default.

Example code

>>> import requests
>>> r = requests.get('https://api.github.com/user', auth=('user', 'pass'))
>>> r.status_code
200
>>> r.headers['content-type']
'application/json; charset=utf8'
>>> r.encoding
'utf-8'
>>> r.text # doctest: +ELLIPSIS
u'{"type":"User"...'
>>> r.json() # doctest: +ELLIPSIS
{u'private_gists': 419, u'total_private_repos': 77, ...}

References

External links

Python (programming language) libraries
Free network-related software
Free software programmed in Python
Software using the Apache license